The Coupe de France 1985–86 was its 69th edition. It was won by Girondins de Bordeaux which defeated Olympique de Marseille in the Final.

Round of 16

Quarter-finals

Semi-finals
First round

Second round

Final

References

French federation

1985–86 domestic association football cups
1985–86 in French football
1985-86